Live In Hollywood is a live album by Linda Ronstadt. It was recorded at Television Center Studios in Hollywood, California on April 24, 1980, for broadcast as a special on HBO. All tracks from this recording except "Blue Bayou" and "Poor Poor Pitiful Me" are previously unreleased. This is the first live album released by Ronstadt. The master tapes, thought to be lost, were discovered through a chance encounter with a Warner Brothers engineer leading to their recovery.

The backing band for this recording includes some of the musicians who collaborated with Ronstadt many times over the years: Kenny Edwards of the Stone Poneys, Danny Kortchmar, Dan Dugmore, Bill Payne of Little Feat, Wendy Waldman, Bob Glaub, Peter Asher and Russ Kunkel. A then fifteen-year-old Wendy Waldman describes meeting Ronstadt for the first time in 1965 and how she later toured with her and came to be on this album. "Desperado" was written by former backing band members Don Henley and Glenn Frey, who went on to form the Eagles.

Some songs performed at the concert, such as "Party Girl", "I Can't Help It (If I'm Still in Love With You)", "Look Out for My Love", "Mad Love", "Cost of Love", "Lies", "Silver Threads and Golden Needles" and "Heat Wave", are not included on the album.

Critical reception

Stephen Thomas Erlewine of AllMusic writes in his interview, "These 12 tracks casually illustrate her facility with both soft rock and old-time rock & roll, and if the set list leans heavily on oldies, the combination of guts and polish makes her renditions memorable."

Hal Horowitz of American Songwriter remarks that "she’s in terrific voice throughout with a few standout performances like the closing 'Desperado' — a knockout, dramatic vocal accompanied only by Payne’s piano — and a powerful take on Roy Orbison’s 'Blue Bayou' (has anyone done that song better?)"

Randy Lewis of the Los Angeles Times writes, "What audiences today hear on Live in Hollywood is exactly what Ronstadt sang into her microphone."

Matt Wardlaw of Ultimate Classic Rock begins his interview with Ronstadt about the album with, "Most artists stick with a repetitively upbeat message when promoting a new project, but the always-honest Linda Ronstadt isn't most artists. In fact, she's expressing doubts about a new concert recording called Live in Hollywood, taken from a performance orchestrated for broadcast by HBO in 1980."

Stephen L. Betts of Rolling Stone writes, "Although the famously self-critical Ronstadt has never liked listening to her own records, she’s thankful the resurgence of vinyl LPs means record buyers have the chance to hear more of the details and nuance labored over by the singer, her band, producers and engineers."

Michael Fremer of Analog Planet writes, "This is the soundtrack to a generation on both the originals and Ronstadt's well-known covers brought back to life for one more go round."

Jim Harrington of Mercury News writes, "Her vocals are strong, clear and convincing as she moves through such winners as 'It's So Easy,' 'Just One Look' and 'Poor Poor Pitiful Me.' And the stunning version of 'Blue Bayou'? Wow. That's one for the time capsule."

Audiophile Audition gives the album 4½ our of 5 stars and has this to say about it in their review. "Linda Ronstadt was a trailblazer. She was a dominant rock and roll singer in a male-dominated genre and stood tall." and "It is a treat to have a recording of this unique talent. The integrity of the audio quality is captured with finesse and verve. The primary instrument, this dazzling voice, is rendered with warmth and subtlety during quieter moments. The muscular fidelity is also on display with tonal vitality."

Coachella Valley Weekly's Eleni P. Austin reviews the album and notes, "The best tracks here display Linda’s seemingly effortless vocal dexterity. The heartbreak of 'Blue Bayou' has never felt so palpable. Roy Orbison’s South of the Border charmer unfurls slowly, lush electric piano, in-the-pocket percussion lachrymose pedal steel and filigreed guitar notes, underscore her yearning tone. She sings the final verse in Spanish, and the results are positively thrilling."

Kevin John Coyne of Country Universe says of the album, "It’s an officially sanctioned, painstakingly mastered keepsake from Ronstadt’s Mad Love tour in 1980, which was broadcast on HBO when it was still a brand new cable channel."

Howard Cohen of the Miami Herald states, "fans will relish finally having live renditions of 'How Do I Make You,' Little Feat's 'Willin'' and the Eagles' 'Desperado.' They won't get Elvis Costello's 'Party Girl,' the Cretones' 'Mad Love' or her 1969 country-rock staple, 'Silver Threads and Golden Needles,' which had figured on that cooking concert stage."

Phil Bausch concludes his On the Records review with, "It’s important that recordings like Live In Hollywood exist to remind the world Linda Ronstadt once possessed one of the greatest Rock and Pop voices of all time."

Track listing

Personnel
 Linda Ronstadt – lead vocals
 Bill Payne – keyboards
 Kenny Edwards – guitar, banjo, backing vocals
 Dan Dugmore – guitar, pedal steel guitar
 Danny Kortchmar – guitar
 Bob Glaub – bass
 Russ Kunkel – drums
 Peter Asher – percussion, backing vocals
 Wendy Waldman – backing vocals

Production
 Reissue Producer and Liner Notes – John Boylan
 Executive Producer – Peter Asher
 Recorded and Mixed by Val Garay
 Compilation Engineers – John Boylan, Rob Jacobs and Tim Jaquette.
 Digital Transfers – Craig Anderson and David Dieckmann
 Mastered by Bernie Grundman at Capitol Mastering (Hollywood, California).
 Art Direction and Design – John Kosh
 Cover Photography – Jim Shea
 Product Manager – Kristal Lautalo
 Project Assistance – John Srebalus, Shannon Ward and Rory Wilson.

Technical Stage/Tour Personnel
 Tour/Production Manager - Eric Barrett
 Stage Manager - Don Forte
 Live Sound Engineer - Buford Jones
 Lighting Design/Engineer - Alan Owen
 Monitor Mixer - Mark Hughes
 Sound Engineer - Al Childress
 Lighting Crew: Craig Campbell; Juan Gonzales; Kelvin Kerr
 Rigger - Stanley Marye

Linda Ronstadt Crew
 Vern Constan - Keyboards and Electronics
 Leroy Kerr - Guitar Technician
 Billy Taylor - Drum Technician
 Edd Kolakowski - Steinway Piano Technician
 Ass'ts. to Ms. Ronstadt: Lois Levine; Deborah Howell

Track information and Personnel credits verified from the album's liner notes.

References

External links
 Official Site for Linda Ronstadt
 Official Site for Rhino

2019 live albums
Rhino Records live albums
Linda Ronstadt albums